is a Japanese tennis player.

Niki has a career high ATP singles ranking of 278 achieved on 23 March 2015. He also has a career high ATP doubles ranking of 269 achieved on 23 April 2018.

Niki made his ATP main draw debut at the 2015 ATP Shenzhen Open where he qualified for the main draw. He lost to Bai Yan in the first round.

He has reached 22 singles finals to date, posting a record of 10 wins and 12 losses. Additionally, he has reached 57 doubles finals, holding a record of 26 wins and 31 losses. All of his career finals in both single and doubles have come on the ITF Futures Tour with the exception of 1, where he and partner Yuichi Ito lost in the final of the ATP Challenger tournament in Granby Canada.

ATP Challenger and ITF Futures finals

Singles: 22 (10–12)

Doubles: 57 (26–31)

External links
 
 

1987 births
Living people
Japanese male tennis players
Universiade medalists in tennis
Universiade bronze medalists for Japan
Medalists at the 2011 Summer Universiade
20th-century Japanese people
21st-century Japanese people